John Sproten was a pre-Reformation cleric who was appointed the Bishop of Sodor and Man in the late 14th century.

A Dominican friar, he was appointed the bishop of the diocese of Sodor and Man by Pope Boniface IX on 16 April 1392. It is not known when his episcopate ended, but his successor Conrad was appointed on 9 January 1402.

References 

 
 
 
 
 

14th-century English Roman Catholic bishops
15th-century English Roman Catholic bishops
Bishops of Sodor and Man
Dominican bishops
Year of birth unknown
Year of death unknown